A timeline of atomic and subatomic physics.

Early beginnings
In 6th century BCE, Acharya Kanada proposed that all matter must consist of indivisible particles and called them "anu". He proposes examples like ripening of fruit as the change in the number and types of atoms to create newer units.
430 BCE Democritus speculates about fundamental indivisible particles—calls them "atoms"

The beginning of chemistry
 1766 Henry Cavendish discovers and studies hydrogen
 1778 Carl Scheele and Antoine Lavoisier discover that air is composed mostly of nitrogen and oxygen
 1781 Joseph Priestley creates water by igniting hydrogen and oxygen
 1800 William Nicholson and Anthony Carlisle use electrolysis to separate water into hydrogen and oxygen
 1803 John Dalton introduces atomic ideas into chemistry and states that matter is composed of atoms of different weights
 1805 (approximate time) Thomas Young conducts the double-slit experiment with light
 1811 Amedeo Avogadro claims that equal volumes of gases should contain equal numbers of molecules
 1832 Michael Faraday states his laws of electrolysis
 1871 Dmitri Mendeleyev systematically examines the periodic table and predicts the existence of gallium, scandium, and germanium
 1873 Johannes van der Waals introduces the idea of weak attractive forces between molecules
 1885 Johann Balmer finds a mathematical expression for observed hydrogen line wavelengths
 1887 Heinrich Hertz discovers the photoelectric effect
 1894 Lord Rayleigh and William Ramsay discover argon by spectroscopically analyzing the gas left over after nitrogen and oxygen are removed from air
 1895 William Ramsay discovers terrestrial helium by spectroscopically analyzing gas produced by decaying uranium
 1896 Antoine Becquerel discovers the radioactivity of uranium
 1896 Pieter Zeeman studies the splitting of sodium D lines when sodium is held in a flame between strong magnetic poles
 1897 Emil Wiechert, Walter Kaufmann and J.J. Thomson discover the electron
 1898 Marie and Pierre Curie discovered the existence of the radioactive elements radium and polonium in their research of pitchblende
 1898 William Ramsay and Morris Travers discover neon, and negatively charged beta particles

The age of quantum mechanics
 1887 Heinrich Rudolf Hertz discovers the photoelectric effect that will play a very important role in the development of the quantum theory with Einstein's explanation of this effect in terms of quanta of light
 1896 Wilhelm Conrad Röntgen discovers the X-rays while studying electrons in plasma; scattering X-rays—that were considered as 'waves' of high-energy electromagnetic radiation—Arthur Compton will be able to demonstrate in 1922 the 'particle' aspect of electromagnetic radiation.
 1900 Paul Villard discovers gamma-rays while studying uranium decay
 1900 Johannes Rydberg refines the expression for observed hydrogen line wavelengths
 1900 Max Planck states his quantum hypothesis and blackbody radiation law
 1902 Philipp Lenard observes that maximum photoelectron energies are independent of illuminating intensity but depend on frequency
 1905 Albert Einstein explains the photoelectric effect
 1906 Charles Barkla discovers that each element has a characteristic X-ray and that the degree of penetration of these X-rays is related to the atomic weight of the element
 1909 Hans Geiger and Ernest Marsden discover large angle deflections of alpha particles by thin metal foils
 1909 Ernest Rutherford and Thomas Royds demonstrate that alpha particles are doubly ionized helium atoms
 1911 Ernest Rutherford explains the Geiger–Marsden experiment by invoking a nuclear atom model and derives the Rutherford cross section
 1911 Jean Perrin proves the existence of atoms and molecules with experimental work to test Einstein's theoretical explanation of Brownian motion
 1911 Ștefan Procopiu measures the magnetic dipole moment of the electron
 1912 Max von Laue suggests using crystal lattices to diffract X-rays
 1912 Walter Friedrich and Paul Knipping diffract X-rays in zinc blende
 1913 William Henry Bragg and William Lawrence Bragg work out the Bragg condition for strong X-ray reflection
 1913 Henry Moseley shows that nuclear charge is the real basis for numbering the elements
 1913 Niels Bohr presents his quantum model of the atom
 1913 Robert Millikan measures the fundamental unit of electric charge
 1913 Johannes Stark demonstrates that strong electric fields will split the Balmer spectral line series of hydrogen
 1914 James Franck and Gustav Hertz observe atomic excitation
 1914 Ernest Rutherford suggests that the positively charged atomic nucleus contains protons
 1915 Arnold Sommerfeld develops a modified Bohr atomic model with elliptic orbits to explain relativistic fine structure
 1916 Gilbert N. Lewis and Irving Langmuir formulate an electron shell model of chemical bonding
 1917 Albert Einstein introduces the idea of stimulated radiation emission
 1918 Ernest Rutherford notices that, when alpha particles were shot into nitrogen gas, his scintillation detectors showed the signatures of hydrogen nuclei.
 1921 Alfred Landé introduces the Landé g-factor
 1922 Arthur Compton studies X-ray photon scattering by electrons demonstrating the 'particle' aspect of electromagnetic radiation.
 1922 Otto Stern and Walther Gerlach show "spin quantization"
 1923 Lise Meitner discovers what is now referred to as the Auger process
 1924 Louis de Broglie suggests that electrons may have wavelike properties in addition to their 'particle' properties; the wave–particle duality has been later extended to all fermions and bosons.
 1924 John Lennard-Jones proposes a semiempirical interatomic force law
 1924 Santiago Antúnez de Mayolo proposes a neutron.
 1924 Satyendra Bose and Albert Einstein introduce Bose–Einstein statistics
 1925 Wolfgang Pauli states the quantum exclusion principle for electrons
 1925 George Uhlenbeck and Samuel Goudsmit postulate electron spin
 1925 Pierre Auger discovers the Auger process (2 years after Lise Meitner)
 1925 Werner Heisenberg, Max Born, and Pascual Jordan formulate quantum matrix mechanics
 1926 Erwin Schrödinger states his nonrelativistic quantum wave equation and formulates quantum wave mechanics
 1926 Erwin Schrödinger proves that the wave and matrix formulations of quantum theory are mathematically equivalent
 1926 Oskar Klein and Walter Gordon state their relativistic quantum wave equation, now the Klein–Gordon equation
 1926 Enrico Fermi discovers the spin–statistics connection, for particles that are now called 'fermions', such as the electron (of spin-1/2).
 1926 Paul Dirac introduces Fermi–Dirac statistics
 1926 Gilbert N. Lewis introduces the term "photon", thought by him to be "the carrier of radiant energy."
 1927 Clinton Davisson, Lester Germer, and George Paget Thomson confirm the wavelike nature of electrons
 1927 Werner Heisenberg states the quantum uncertainty principle
 1927 Max Born interprets the probabilistic nature of wavefunctions
 1927 Walter Heitler and Fritz London introduce the concepts of valence bond theory and apply it to the hydrogen molecule.
 1927 Thomas and Fermi develop the Thomas–Fermi model
 1927 Max Born and Robert Oppenheimer introduce the Born–Oppenheimer approximation
 1928 Chandrasekhara Raman studies optical photon scattering by electrons
 1928 Paul Dirac states his relativistic electron quantum wave equation
 1928 Charles G. Darwin and Walter Gordon solve the Dirac equation for a Coulomb potential
 1928 Friedrich Hund and Robert S. Mulliken introduce the concept of molecular orbital
 1929 Oskar Klein discovers the Klein paradox
 1929 Oskar Klein and Yoshio Nishina derive the Klein–Nishina cross section for high energy photon scattering by electrons
 1929 Nevill Mott derives the Mott cross section for the Coulomb scattering of relativistic electrons
 1930 Paul Dirac introduces electron hole theory
 1930 Erwin Schrödinger predicts the zitterbewegung motion
 1930 Fritz London explains van der Waals forces as due to the interacting fluctuating dipole moments between molecules
 1931 John Lennard-Jones proposes the Lennard-Jones interatomic potential
 1931 Irène Joliot-Curie and Frédéric Joliot observe but misinterpret neutron scattering in paraffin
 1931 Wolfgang Pauli puts forth the neutrino hypothesis to explain the apparent violation of energy conservation in beta decay
 1931 Linus Pauling discovers resonance bonding and uses it to explain the high stability of symmetric planar molecules
 1931 Paul Dirac shows that charge quantization can be explained if magnetic monopoles exist
 1931 Harold Urey discovers deuterium using evaporation concentration techniques and spectroscopy
 1932 John Cockcroft and Ernest Walton split lithium and boron nuclei using proton bombardment
 1932 James Chadwick discovers the neutron
 1932 Werner Heisenberg presents the proton–neutron model of the nucleus and uses it to explain isotopes
 1932 Carl D. Anderson discovers the positron
 1933 Ernst Stueckelberg (1932), Lev Landau (1932), and Clarence Zener discover the Landau–Zener transition
 1933 Max Delbrück suggests that quantum effects will cause photons to be scattered by an external electric field
 1934 Irène Joliot-Curie and Frédéric Joliot bombard aluminium atoms with alpha particles to create artificially radioactive phosphorus-30
 1934 Leó Szilárd realizes that nuclear chain reactions may be possible
 1934 Enrico Fermi publishes a very successful model of beta decay in which neutrinos were produced.
 1934 Lev Landau tells Edward Teller that non-linear molecules may have vibrational modes which remove the degeneracy of an orbitally degenerate state (Jahn–Teller effect)
 1934 Enrico Fermi suggests bombarding uranium atoms with neutrons to make a 93 proton element
 1934 Pavel Cherenkov reports that light is emitted by relativistic particles traveling in a nonscintillating liquid
 1935 Hideki Yukawa presents a theory of the nuclear force and predicts the scalar meson
 1935 Albert Einstein, Boris Podolsky, and Nathan Rosen put forth the EPR paradox
 1935 Henry Eyring develops the transition state theory
 1935 Niels Bohr presents his analysis of the EPR paradox
 1936 Alexandru Proca formulates the relativistic quantum field equations for a massive vector meson of spin-1 as a basis for nuclear forces
 1936 Eugene Wigner develops the theory of neutron absorption by atomic nuclei
 1936 Hermann Arthur Jahn and Edward Teller present their systematic study of the symmetry types for which the Jahn–Teller effect is expected
 1937	Carl Anderson proves experimentally the existence of the pion predicted by Yukawa's theory.
 1937 Hans Hellmann finds the Hellmann–Feynman theorem
 1937 Seth Neddermeyer, Carl Anderson, J.C. Street, and E.C. Stevenson discover muons using cloud chamber measurements of cosmic rays
 1939 Richard Feynman finds the Hellmann–Feynman theorem
 1939 Otto Hahn and Fritz Strassmann bombard uranium salts with thermal neutrons and discover barium among the reaction products
 1939 Lise Meitner and Otto Robert Frisch determine that nuclear fission is taking place in the Hahn–Strassmann experiments
 1942 Enrico Fermi makes the first controlled nuclear chain reaction
 1942 Ernst Stueckelberg introduces the propagator to positron theory and interprets positrons as negative energy electrons moving backwards through spacetime
 1947 Willis Lamb and Robert Retherford measure the Lamb–Retherford shift
 1947 Cecil Powell, César Lattes, and Giuseppe Occhialini discover the pi meson by studying cosmic ray tracks
 1947 Richard Feynman presents his propagator approach to quantum electrodynamics
 1948 Hendrik Casimir predicts a rudimentary attractive Casimir force on a parallel plate capacitor
 1951 Martin Deutsch discovers positronium
 1952 David Bohm propose his interpretation of quantum mechanics
 1953 Robert Wilson observes Delbruck scattering of 1.33 MeV gamma-rays by the electric fields of lead nuclei
 1953	Charles H. Townes, collaborating with J. P. Gordon, and H. J. Zeiger, builds the first ammonia maser
 1954 Chen Ning Yang and Robert Mills investigate a theory of hadronic isospin by demanding local gauge invariance under isotopic spin space rotations, the first non-Abelian gauge theory
 1955 Owen Chamberlain, Emilio Segrè, Clyde Wiegand, and Thomas Ypsilantis discover the antiproton
 1956 Frederick Reines and Clyde Cowan detect antineutrino
 1956 Chen Ning Yang and Tsung Lee propose parity violation by the weak nuclear force
 1956 Chien Shiung Wu discovers parity violation by the weak force in decaying cobalt
 1957 Gerhart Luders proves the CPT theorem
 1957 Richard Feynman, Murray Gell-Mann, Robert Marshak, and E.C.G. Sudarshan propose a vector/axial vector (VA) Lagrangian for weak interactions.
 1958 Marcus Sparnaay experimentally confirms the Casimir effect
 1959 Yakir Aharonov and David Bohm predict the Aharonov–Bohm effect
 1960 R.G. Chambers experimentally confirms the Aharonov–Bohm effect
 1961 Murray Gell-Mann and Yuval Ne'eman discover the Eightfold Way patterns, the SU(3) group
 1961 Jeffrey Goldstone considers the breaking of global phase symmetry
 1962 Leon Lederman shows that the electron neutrino is distinct from the muon neutrino
 1963 Eugene Wigner discovers the fundamental roles played by quantum symmetries in atoms and molecules

The formation and successes of the Standard Model
 1964 Murray Gell-Mann and George Zweig propose the quark/aces model
 1964 Peter Higgs considers the breaking of local phase symmetry
 1964 John Stewart Bell shows that all local hidden variable theories must satisfy Bell's inequality
 1964 Val Fitch and James Cronin observe CP violation by the weak force in the decay of K mesons
 1967 Steven Weinberg puts forth his electroweak model of leptons
 1969 John Clauser, Michael Horne, Abner Shimony and Richard Holt propose a polarization correlation test of Bell's inequality
 1970 Sheldon Glashow, John Iliopoulos, and Luciano Maiani propose the charm quark
 1971 Gerard 't Hooft shows that the Glashow-Salam-Weinberg electroweak model can be renormalized
 1972 Stuart Freedman and John Clauser perform the first polarization correlation test of Bell's inequality
 1973 David Politzer and Frank Anthony Wilczek propose the asymptotic freedom of quarks
 1974 Burton Richter and Samuel Ting discover the J/ψ particle implying the existence of the charm quark
 1974 Robert J. Buenker and Sigrid D. Peyerimhoff introduce the multireference configuration interaction method.
 1975 Martin Perl discovers the tau lepton
 1977 Steve Herb finds the upsilon resonance implying the existence of the beauty/bottom quark
 1982 Alain Aspect, J. Dalibard, and G. Roger perform a polarization correlation test of Bell's inequality that rules out conspiratorial polarizer communication
 1983 Carlo Rubbia, Simon van der Meer, and the CERN UA-1 collaboration find the W and Z intermediate vector bosons
 1989 The Z intermediate vector boson resonance width indicates three quark-lepton generations
 1994 The CERN LEAR Crystal Barrel Experiment justifies the existence of glueballs (exotic meson).
 1995 The D0 and CDF experiments at the Fermilab Tevatron discover the top quark.
 1998 Super-Kamiokande (Japan) observes evidence for neutrino oscillations, implying that at least one neutrino has mass.
 1999 Ahmed Zewail wins the Nobel prize in chemistry for his work on femtochemistry for atoms and molecules.
 2001 The Sudbury Neutrino Observatory (Canada) confirms the existence of neutrino oscillations.
 2005 At the RHIC accelerator of Brookhaven National Laboratory they have created a quark–gluon liquid of very low viscosity, perhaps the quark–gluon plasma
 2010 The Large Hadron Collider at CERN begins operation with the primary goal of searching for the Higgs boson.
 2012 CERN announces the discovery of a new particle with properties consistent with the Higgs boson of the Standard Model after experiments at the Large Hadron Collider.

Quantum field theories beyond the Standard Model

 2000 Steven Weinberg. Supersymmetry and Quantum Gravity.
2003 Leonid Vainerman. Quantum groups, Hopf algebras and quantum field applications.
Noncommutative quantum field theory
 M.R. Douglas and N. A. Nekrasov (2001) "Noncommutative field theory," Rev. Mod. Phys. 73: 977–1029.
 Szabo, R. J. (2003) "Quantum Field Theory on Noncommutative Spaces," Physics Reports 378: 207–99. An expository article on noncommutative quantum field theories.
Noncommutative quantum field theory, see statistics on arxiv.org
 Seiberg, N. and E. Witten (1999) "String Theory and Noncommutative Geometry," Journal of High Energy Physics
 Sergio Doplicher, Klaus Fredenhagen and John Roberts, Sergio Doplicher, Klaus Fredenhagen, John E. Roberts (1995) The quantum structure of spacetime at the Planck scale and quantum fields," Commun. Math. Phys. 172: 187–220.
 Alain Connes (1994) Noncommutative geometry. Academic Press. .
 -------- (1995) "Noncommutative geometry and reality", J. Math. Phys. 36: 6194.
 -------- (1996) "Gravity coupled with matter and the foundation of noncommutative geometry," Comm. Math. Phys. 155: 109.
 -------- (2006) "Noncommutative geometry and physics,"
 -------- and M. Marcolli, Noncommutative Geometry: Quantum Fields and Motives. American Mathematical Society (2007).
 Chamseddine, A., A. Connes (1996) "The spectral action principle," Comm. Math. Phys. 182: 155.
 Chamseddine, A., A. Connes, M. Marcolli (2007) "Gravity and the Standard Model with neutrino mixing," Adv. Theor. Math. Phys. 11: 991.
 Jureit, Jan-H., Thomas Krajewski, Thomas Schücker, and Christoph A. Stephan (2007) "On the noncommutative standard model," Acta Phys. Polon. B38: 3181–3202.
Schücker, Thomas (2005) Forces from Connes's geometry. Lecture Notes in Physics 659, Springer.
Noncommutative standard model
Noncommutative geometry

See also
History of subatomic physics
History of quantum mechanics
History of quantum field theory
History of the molecule
History of thermodynamics
History of chemistry
Golden age of physics

References

External links
 Alain Connes official website with downloadable papers.
Alain Connes's Standard Model.
A History of Quantum Mechanics 
A Brief History of Quantum Mechanics

Particle physics
Nuclear physics
Atomic physics
Atomic